Janis E. Johnston (born 1957) is an American statistician, sociologist, and book author known for her work on permutation tests in statistics. Johnston earned a Ph.D. in 2006 from Colorado State University, and works as a social science analyst for the Food and Nutrition Service of the United States Department of Agriculture.

Her books include:
A Chronicle of Permutation Statistical Methods: 1920–2000, and Beyond (with Kenneth J. Berry and Paul W. Mielke Jr., Springer, 2014)
Inequality: Social Class and Its Consequences (edited with D. Stanley Eitzen, Paradigm Publishers, 2007, and Routledge, 2015)
Permutation Statistical Methods: An Integrated Approach (with Kenneth J. Berry and Paul W. Mielke Jr., Springer, 2016)
The Measurement of Association: A Permutation Statistical Approach (with Kenneth J. Berry and Paul W. Mielke Jr., Springer, 2018)
A Primer of Permutation Statistical Methods (with Kenneth J. Berry and Paul W. Mielke Jr., Springer, 2019)

References

1957 births
Living people
American women sociologists
American sociologists
American women statisticians
Colorado State University alumni
21st-century American women